Xbox Entertainment Studios was an American entertainment studio based in Redmond, Washington created internally by Microsoft Studios in 2012, in order to create "interactive television content" for Xbox Live. All programming is provided exclusively via Xbox 360 and Xbox One.

Microsoft closed Xbox Entertainment Studios at the end of 2014.

Original programming

Series

Films

Specials

Cancelled original programming

Series

References

Entertainment Studios original programs
Xbox Entertainment Studios